Taleb Jaloub (born 1 July 1955) is a former Iraqi football defender. He competed in the 1985 Pan Arab Games. Chaloub played for Iraq in 1985.

References

Living people
Iraqi footballers
Iraq international footballers
Place of birth missing (living people)
1955 births
Association football defenders